Efren Alexander Prieto Machado (born in Puerto Ordaz, Bolivar, Venezuela on January 2, 1984) is a Venezuelan broadcast television journalist, model and entertainer who won the title of Mister Integral Beauty and First runner-up Mister Tourism Bolivar in March 2004.

Efren Prieto was the official representative of Lara State for the Mister Tourism Venezuela 2004 pageant in Valencia, Venezuela, on September 7, 2004, when he placed in the top 10 semifinalists.

References 

1984 births
Living people
Venezuelan entertainers
Venezuelan journalists
Venezuelan male models